Mohammad Abdul Hakim is a Bangladesh Awami League politician and the former Member of Parliament of Mymensingh-5.

Career
Hakim was elected to parliament from Mymensingh-5 as a Bangladesh Awami League candidate in 1973.

References

Awami League politicians
Living people
1st Jatiya Sangsad members
Year of birth missing (living people)